This article shows the rosters of all participating teams at the men's indoor volleyball tournament at the 2016 Summer Olympics in Rio de Janeiro.

Pool A

The following is the Brazilian roster in the men's volleyball tournament of the 2016 Summer Olympics.

Head coach: Bernardo Rezende

The following was the Canada roster in the men's volleyball tournament of the 2016 Summer Olympics. The team was announced officially on July 22, 2016.

Head coach: Glenn Hoag

The following is the French roster in the men's volleyball tournament of the 2016 Summer Olympics.

Head coach: Laurent Tillie

The following is the Italian roster in the men's volleyball tournament of the 2016 Summer Olympics.

Head coach: Gianlorenzo Blengini

The following is the Mexican roster in the men's volleyball tournament of the 2016 Summer Olympics.

Head coach: Jorge Azair

The following is the American roster in the men's volleyball tournament of the 2016 Summer Olympics.

Head coach: John Speraw

Pool B

The following is the Argentine roster in the men's volleyball tournament of the 2016 Summer Olympics.

Head coach: Julio Velasco

The following is the Cuban roster in the men's volleyball tournament of the 2016 Summer Olympics.

Head coach: Nicolás Vives

The following is the Egyptian roster in the men's volleyball tournament of the 2016 Summer Olympics.

Head coach: Sherif El Shemerly

The following is the Iranian roster in the men's volleyball tournament of the 2016 Summer Olympics.

Head coach: Raúl Lozano

The following is the Polish roster in the men's volleyball tournament of the 2016 Summer Olympics.

Head coach: Stéphane Antiga

The following is the Russian roster in the men's volleyball tournament of the 2016 Summer Olympics.

Head coach: Vladimir Alekno

See also
Volleyball at the 2016 Summer Olympics – Women's team rosters

References

External links
Teams

2016
Men's team rosters